Ganja Karuppu is an Indian actor who has predominantly appeared in comedy roles in Tamil cinema. After making his debut in Bala's Pithamagan (2003), Ganja Karuppu experienced success in the late 2000s with his roles in Raam (2005),  Sivakasi (2005), Paruthiveeran (2007), Subramaniyapuram (2008) and Naadodigal (2009).

Career 
Karuppu was introduced as an actor by director Bala in Pithamagan (2003) as a person who works in the ganja plantations. As a result of the role, he was thereafter credited in films as Ganja Karuppu. In the 2000s, he subsequently was regularly cast in rural films by directors, working on notable films including Ameer's Raam (2005) and Paruthiveeran (2007), Sasikumar's Subramaniapuram (2008), Samuthirakani's Naadodigal (2009) and Sargunam's Kalavani (2010). During the period, he was also cast in the second lead role in Chimbudevan's Arai En 305-il Kadavul (2008) alongside Santhanam, produced by S Pictures. The period of success meant that he was cast in the lead role of a film titled Mannar Valaikuda by Dhanasekaran. Despite making progress, the film about the plight of the fishermen community did not have a theatrical release.

In 2012, Karuppu was set to enter Bollywood with a role in the Hindi remake of Samuthirakani's Poraali (2011), but the film eventually did not materialise. He had revealed that he would change his name to "Ganja Khan" for his stint in the Hindi film industry. Karuppu chose to turn film producer with Velmurugan Borewells (2014) but the film went through production delays and had a low profile theatrical release, losing him a significant amount of money. Director Bala later criticised Karuppu for unnecessarily putting his acting career in jeopardy with the move. Following a period away from notable films, Karuppu made a comeback with significant roles in S. J. Surya's as Isai (2015) and Dharma Durai (2016).

In 2017, he participated in the first season of the Tamil reality television show Bigg Boss hosted by Kamal Haasan. After regularly clashing with fellow actor Bharani, he was evicted on day 14.

Personal life 
He married Sangeetha, a physiotherapist, in January 2010 in a ceremony held in his home town of Nattarasankottai. His first son was born in April 2011 in Madurai. In 2013, he chose to adopt the expenses of five mentally ill people in Trichy. Later in 2016, he announced his intentions of becoming a politician.

Filmography 

Television
Bigg Boss Tamil 1 – Evicted Day 14 (2017) (Contestant)

References

External links 
 

Tamil male actors
Indian male film actors
Living people
Tamil comedians
People from Sivaganga district
Male actors in Tamil cinema
Indian male comedians
Male actors from Tamil Nadu
Bigg Boss (Tamil TV series) contestants
1976 births